Francesco III Gonzaga (10 March 1533 – 22 February 1550) was Duke of Mantua and Marquess of Montferrat from 1540 until his death. He was the eldest son of Federico II Gonzaga, Duke of Mantua and his wife Margaret Paleologina.

Life
On 22 October 1549, he married Catherine of Habsburg, a daughter of Holy Roman Emperor Ferdinand I. The marriage lasted only four months as Francesco died of pneumonia on 21 February 1550, after falling into one of Mantua lakes during a hunt. Widowed Catherine returned home to Innsbruck. Habsburgs claimed that the marriage was not consummated to increase Catherine's chances for a better second marriage.

Honours
 Knight of the Order of the Golden Fleece

Ancestry

References

Sources

|-

|-

1533 births
1550 deaths
Francesco 3
Francesco 3
Francesco 3
16th-century Italian nobility
Burials at the Palatine Basilica of Santa Barbara (Mantua)